This article contains a list of fossil-bearing stratigraphic units in the state of Ohio, U.S.

Sites

See also

 Paleontology in Ohio

References

 

Ohio
Paleontology in Ohio
Stratigraphy of Ohio
Ohio geography-related lists
United States geology-related lists